Eilert Dahlberg (born April 2, 1953, in Anundsjö, Sweden), who uses the stage name Eilert Pilarm, is a Swedish Elvis impersonator. He gained fame when he performed on Morgonpasset on Sveriges Radio in 1992.

Career 
Pilarm self-released several cassettes before his debut CD Greatest Hits was released in 1996 on MCA. Eilert is Back! followed in 1998 and Live in Stockholm appeared in 2000. He stopped performing in 2002 after 600 gigs and six albums.

Pilarm is one of several musicians featured in Irwin Chusid's book Songs in the Key of Z, which focuses on outsider music.

His album Eilerts Jul ("Eilert's Christmas") frequently appears in internet lists of "worst album covers of all time".

He used to own a Royal Enfield motorbike, but has since sold it, and at present it resides in Tavelsjö.

References

External links
Official website 
A fan site

1953 births
Living people
Elvis impersonators
Outsider musicians
People from Örnsköldsvik Municipality
Swedish male musicians